The Prix Paul Doistau–Émile Blutet is a biennial prize awarded by the French Academy of Sciences in the fields of mathematics and physical sciences since 1954. Each recipient receives 3000 euros. The prize is also awarded quadrennially in biology. The award is also occasionally awarded in other disciplines.

List of laureates

Mathematics 
 1958 Marc Krasner
 1980 Jean-Michel Bony
 1982 Jean-Pierre Ramis
 1982 Gérard Maugin
 1985 Dominique Foata
 1986 Pierre-Louis Lions
 1987 Pierre Bérard
 1987 Lucien Szpiro
 1999 Wendelin Werner
 2001 Hélène Esnault
 2004 Laurent Stolovitch
 2006 Alice Guionnet
 2008 Isabelle Gallagher
 2010 Yves André
 2012 Serge Cantat
 2014 Sébastien Boucksom
 2016 Hajer Bahouri
 2018

Physical sciences 

 2002 
 2005 Mustapha Besbes
 2007 
 2009 Hasnaa Chennaoui-Aoudjehane
 2011 Henri-Claude Nataf
 2013 
 2015 Philippe André
 2019

Integrative biology 

 2000 Jérôme Giraudat
 2004 Marie-Claire Verdus
 2008 Hélène Barbier-Brygoo
 2012 Olivier Hamant

Mechanical and computational science
 2000 Annie Raoult 
 2002 Gilles Francfort
 2002 Jean-Jacques Marigo
 2006 Hubert Maigre
 2006 Andreï Constantinescu
 2008 Pierre Comte
 2010 Nicolas Triantafyllidis
 2012 Élisabeth Guazzelli
 2014 Jacques Magnaudet
 2019 Denis Sipp

Other disciplines 
 1967 Jacques Blamont
 1975 
 1976 Martial Ducloy
 1976 Arlette Nougarède
 1981 Christian Bordé
 1988 
 
 2019

References

Awards of the French Academy of Sciences
Awards established in the 1950s
Mathematics awards